The Basketball Champions League (BCL) Game Day MVP (Most Valuable Player) is the award given to the Basketball Champions League's best player of each game day of the season. Each game on the Basketball Champions League's season schedule is considered to be an individual round, or "game day".

Selection criteria
After each game day, a selection of five players with the highest efficiency ratings, is made by the Basketball Champions League. Afterwards, the official website, championsleague.basketball, decides which player is crowned Game Day MVP.

2016–17 Basketball Champions League season
Player nationalities by national team:
Regular Season

Playoffs Qualifiers MVP

Round of 16 MVP

Quarterfinals MVP

Final Four MVP

2017–18 Basketball Champions League season
Player nationalities by national team:
Regular Season

Round of 16

2018–19 Basketball Champions League season
Player nationalities by national team:
Regular Season

Round of 16

Quarterfinals

2019–20 Basketball Champions League season
Player nationalities by national team:
Regular Season

See also
Basketball Champions League MVP
Basketball Champions League Final Four MVP
Basketball Champions League Star Lineup
Basketball Champions League Top Scorer
Basketball Champions League Best Young Player

References

External links
Basketball Champions League (official website)
FIBA (official website)

Basketball Champions League awards and honors